Twenty (also stylized as 20) was an arena concert by Filipina entertainer Regine Velasquez. The concert was announced in September 2006 and held on two consecutive nights in October at the Araneta Coliseum in Quezon City. Its concept and name is a reference to the twentieth anniversary since her professional debut in 1986. The staging resembled a Roman colosseum connected by a grand staircase extending from the upper box gallery. The setlist contained songs predominantly taken from Velasquez's discography and various covers. The show was produced by Aria Productions, with GMA Network as its broadcast partner. Ronnie Henares served as stage director, while Raul Mitra was chosen as musical director. Guest conductors were featured, including Louie Ocampo and Gerard Salonga, backed by the 60-member ensemble of the Manila Philharmonic Orchestra. It received positive reviews from music critics, who praised Velasquez's vocals and the production.

Background and development

Regine Velasquez's career began with a record deal with OctoArts International and the release of her single "Love Me Again" in 1986. Initially introduced as Chona, she appeared on the variety show The Penthouse Live! and caught the attention of Ronnie Henares, a producer and talent manager who signed her to a management deal. She later adopted the stage name Regine at the suggestion of The Penthouse Live! host Martin Nievera. In 1996, Velasquez staged a show, named Isang Pasasalamat, at UPD's Sunken Garden to commemorate her ten-year career. 

On September 24, 2006, the Philippine Daily Inquirer published that Velasquez would headline a two-night concert to celebrate the twentieth anniversary since her career debut. The show, titled Twenty, would be staged at the Araneta Coliseum on October 13–14 and exclusively promoted by Aria Productions. Velasquez stated, "It's a concert for the fans who have been with me for two decades. I will sing songs that are memorable, not only to me but also to my supporters." She further said that it was vital for her to challenge herself and still be passionate on every project:

At the behest of Velasquez, Henares served as the show's stage director, which marked their first collaboration since parting ways in 2003. Describing his involvement in the production as a "big honor", he said, "I've seen her grow and mature as a performer. She has not changed much but she has so much passion in her music now compared before. And when it comes to giving ideas about her concert, she's really good at it. All I have to do is just put Regine's ideas into place." Raul Mitra was chosen as musical director, accompanied by the 60-member ensemble of the Manila Philharmonic Orchestra. Several guest conductors were tapped for the show, including Louie Ocampo, Gerard Salonga, Mark Lopez, and Mon Faustino. The stage set up was built to resemble a Roman colosseum and featured a grand staircase extending from the upper box gallery.

Synopsis and reception

The concert opened with Velasquez performing an operetta musical number telling the story of her career beginnings, before transitioning to "Narito Ako". Shortly after, she began a medley of "Hot Stuff" and "Shake Your Groove Thing" which contained samples of The Pussycat Dolls's "Buttons" and Don't Cha. She followed this with a performance of "Shine" and continued with an orchestral arrangement of "On the Wings of Love". For the next number, Velasquez sang the movie theme song "Music of Goodbye" while aerialists performed acrobatics. She then introduced conductor Louie Ocampo and began with "What Kind of Fool Am I?". The segment ended with Velasquez joined by various male singers as they sang a medley of her duets.

The setlist continued with guest conductor Mon Faustino at the helm of Velasquez's performance of "Sana Maulit Muli". Next, she began a Ogie Alcasid tribute number, before continuing with "I Don't Want to Miss a Thing". During the performance of "Love Me Again", Velasquez was joined by conductor Gerard Salonga. She spoke briefly to the crowd and thanked her parents, before performing Didith Reyes's "Bakit Ako Mahihiya" and a medley of songs she performed in talent competitions, including "You'll Never Walk Alone" and "And I Am Telling You I'm Not Going". After singing "Till I Met You", Velasquez closed the show with an encore performance of "The Greatest Love of All" and "I Believe".

The concert was met with positive responses from critics, who praised Velasquez's vocal abilities and the production. The Philippine Daily Inquirers Ronald Mangubat described the show as "well-conceptualized" and "highly entertaining". He praised Velasquez's "bravura belting" and her ability to sing "high notes with relative ease". He concluded, "[She did] what some singers failed to achieve—establish a strong connection to her audience". Jojo Panaligan from the Manila Bulletin wrote, "Regine has reached twenty years in the business because others, from past to present, could only approximate the power and impact of her voice. If this goes on, then so will she."

The concert was aired as a television special on GMA Network in 2006. Velasquez was named Best Female Major Concert Act and Entertainer of the Year award at 20th Aliw Awards for the production.

Set list
This set list is adapted from the television special Twenty.

 "Nais Ko" / "Narito Ako"
 "Hot Stuff" / "Shake Your Groove Thing"
 "Shine"
 "On the Wings of Love"
 "Music of Goodbye"
 "What Kind of Fool Am I?"
 "Please Be Careful with My Heart" / "Forever" / "It's Hard to Say Goodbye" / "Magkasuyo Buong Gabi" / "In Love with You" / "Hanggang Ngayon" / "Muli"
 "Sana Maulit Muli"
 "Kailangan Kita" / "Ikaw Lamang"
 "I Don't Want to Miss a Thing"
 "Love Me Again"
 "Bakit Ako Mahihiya"
 "In Your Eyes"
 "You'll Never Walk Alone" / "And I Am Telling You I'm Not Going"
 "Till I Met You"
Encore
 "The Greatest Love of All" / "I Believe"

Personnel
Credits and personnel are adapted from the television special Twenty.

Show

 Wilma Galvanteoverall in charge of production
 Ronnie Henaresshow direction, staging
 Regine Velasquezshow direction, staging
 Louie Ignaciotelevision director
 Raul Mitramusical director
 Juel Balbonexecutive producer
 Cacai Velasquez-Mitraexecutive producer
 Corazon de Jesussupervising producer
 Maro Garciaassociate producer
 Cez Urrutiaassociate producer
 Hazel Abonitaproduction manager
 Liza Camusproduction manager
 Epoy Isonerastage manager
 Bodjie Singsonassistant stage manager
 Tess Padiernosassistant stage director
 Jaime Mejialighting
 Jun Bon Rusticosound engineer
 Mitoy Sta. Anaset designer
 Rajo Laurelcostume design
 Pepsi Herreracostume design
 Edwin Tancostume design

Band

 Manila Philharmonic Orchestra
 U.P. Singing Ambassadors Choir
 Arturo Molinaconductor
 Gerard Salongaguest conductor
 Louie Ocampoguest conductor
 Mon Faustinoguest conductor
 Cesar Aguasguitars
 Meong Pacanaguitars
 Sonny Matiaskeyboards
 Bond Samsonkeyboards
 Tek Faustinodrums
 Babsie Molinabackground vocalist
 Sylvia Macaraegbackground vocalist
 Rene Martinezbackground vocalist

See also
 List of Regine Velasquez live performances

Notes

References

Citations

Book sources

External links
 Tours of Regine Velasquez at Live Nation

Regine Velasquez concert tours
2006 concert tours